Ganga Yamuna Saraswati is a 1998 Indian Tamil-language soap opera that aired on Raj TV. The show stars M. S. Viswanathan, Manivannan, Renuka, Thalaivasal Vijay, Sithara, Pallavi, Muralikumar, Rajashree, M. S. Bhaskar, Poovilangu Mohan and Chitra Lakshmanan.

The show is produced by Thenmozhi Abavaanan for Kalaimani Televisions. The story contributed by Indhumathi and screenplay by Ashokkumar,presath,jeeva, and director by Robert and Ramesh. It had been receiving the highest ratings of Tamil serials and it was credited as the best serial and received high praising from viewers. The title track was composed by M. S. Viswanathan and sung by M. S. Viswanathan and Hariharan. The story about revolves around three characters, Ganga, Yamuna and Saraswathi.

Cast

 M. S. Viswanathan
 Manivannan
 Renuka
 Thalaivasal Vijay
 Sithara
 Pallavi
 Muralikumar
 Chitra Lakshmanan
 Rajashree
 M. S. Bhaskar
Sukumari
Gandhimathi
Pandu

References

External links
 Raj TV Official Site 
 Raj TV on YouTube
 Raj Television Network 

Raj TV television series
2006 Tamil-language television series debuts
2008 Tamil-language television series endings
Tamil-language television shows
2000s Tamil-language television series